Cirqus Voltaire is a 1997 pinball game, designed by John Popadiuk and released by Williams Electronics Games (under the Bally label). The theme involves the player performing many different marvels in order to join the circus. Some of the game's distinctive features include a neon light running along the right-hand ramp, a pop bumper that rises up from the middle of the playfield at certain times, and a magnet at the top of the left ramp that can catch balls and divert them into the locks. The most notable feature is the Ringmaster, a head that rises at certain times and taunts the player.

Description

It was the first Williams/Bally pinball machine missing a real replay-knocker, a device driven by a coil to produce a loud bang when hammering against the wood of the cabinet or backbox. Instead this sound effect was pre-recorded and played via the regular speakers. It was also the second machine (after Capcom's Flipper Football, released in 1996) to move the dot-matrix display (DMD) from the backbox right into the cabinet, in order not to distract the player from gameplay when watching the DMD (an idea that was taken to the maximum with the Pinball 2000 architecture two years later).

Modes 
This game features nine "marvels" the player must complete before they are invited to "Join the Cirqus." The marvels are arranged in a 3x3 square grid, with each row/column corresponding to one letter in the word C-I-R-Q-U-S. After filling the grid, the player must shoot the left or right orbit to start the "Join the Cirqus" wizard mode.

 Juggler - Shoot the left orbit three times to enable locks, then shoot it three more times to lock balls and start Juggler Multiball.
 Side Show - Shoot the left orbit when the Side Show is lit to spot this marvel and receive a random award.
 Ringmaster Frenzie - Defeat the Ringmaster twice to start Frenzie Multiball.

 Menagerie - Hit a set of targets on the left side a set number of times, either directly or by knocking a large plastic captive ball into them.
 Defeated All Ringmasters - Defeat the Ringmaster four times to start Special Multiball.
 Highwire Multiball - Hit the "Light Lock" targets on either side of the left ramp, then shoot the ramp itself three times to lock balls and start Highwire Multiball.
 Spin - The spinner target in the small loop that curves around the Ringmaster can be shot to light letters in S-P-I-N; the marvel is awarded once all four letters are lit.
 Boom! - Hit the rollover targets on the field to light letters in V-O-L-T. Once all four letters are collected, a third pop bumper rises from the field for a short time; the marvel is awarded after the time runs out. Hits on this bumper count toward lighting an extra ball.
 Acrobats - Shoot the right ramp/orbit four times.

The Ringmaster 

The Ringmaster normally resides below the playfield, with a flat circular platform attached to the top of his head. This platform sits directly in front of the three W-O-W targets in the upper right corner and contains a hidden magnet. Once the targets have been hit a total of three times, the magnet catches and holds the ball as the Ringmaster rises and taunts the player. The ball is then flung off in a random direction, with a brief ball saver in case it flies out of play. After the Ringmaster and/or the standup targets immediately to either side are hit a total of five times, he rises farther to expose a hole; shooting a ball into this hole results in his defeat. 

Until Join the Cirqus is played for the first time, each defeated Ringmaster after the first starts a multiball mode, in the following order:

 Ringmaster Frenzie - Completing this multiball awards the Frenzie marvel.
 Ringmaster Razz - Starting this multiball for the first time lights an extra ball.
 Ringmaster Special - Completing this multiball awards the "Defeated All Ringmasters" marvel.
 Ringmaster Battle - Can only be played if "Defeated All Ringmasters" is not the last marvel collected. This is the only Ringmaster multiball styled as a fight that the player can win or lose. If the player wins, an extra ball is lit and the Ringmaster is disabled until Join the Cirqus has been played.

After Join the Cirqus is played and regular play resumes, the first Ringmaster defeat starts Frenzie and further defeats follow the above progression.

If the Ringmaster throws the ball into the Highwire Multiball lock, the player is credited with a "Sneaky Lock" toward starting that mode.

Multiball 
This game features eight multiball modes, which can be "stacked" or made to run concurrently in various combinations. These are:

 Highwire Multiball (see "Marvels" above), three balls
 Juggler Multiball (see "Marvels" above), three balls
 Neon Multiball (one of the Side Show random awards), three balls
 Strike-an-Arc Multiball (started by shooting the left ramp a set number of times), two balls
 Ringmaster (see "The Ringmaster" above), two balls each
 Ringmaster Frenzie
 Ringmaster Razz
 Ringmaster Special
 Ringmaster Battle

When multiballs are stacked, a total of four balls are put into play.

Join the Cirqus 

After collecting all nine marvels, the player can start Join the Cirqus by shooting either orbit. Play then proceeds through four phases, with all other features disabled. After each of the first three phases is completed, the flippers and targets briefly go dead and all the balls drain as part of the lead-in to the next phase.

 Spell C-I-R-Q-U-S: A three-ball multiball. Hit all six major shots (both orbits, left ramp, Menagerie, Ringmaster loop, W-O-W targets) in any order. 
 Unmask Voltaire: A three-ball multiball. Hit the Ringmaster and then the left ramp, alternating between them four times, and hit the Ringmaster a fifth time.
 Meet the Cirqus: Make six lit shots to the orbits and Ringmaster loop. This phase starts with one ball and adds one for each successful shot, to a maximum of three.
 Party Multiball: A four-ball multiball with all major shots lit for jackpots. 

Join the Cirqus ends when either all balls drain in any of the first three phases, or when three balls drain in the fourth.

Digital versions
Cirqus Voltaire was formerly available as a licensed table of The Pinball Arcade for any platform until June 30, 2018 due to WMS license expiration.  The license was then passed to Zen Studios, who then brought back an official digital version of the table as an add-on for Pinball FX 3 and an unlockable table in the Williams Pinball mobile app for iOS and Android as part of the fifth wave of Zen Studios' curation of Williams tables.

Unlicensed recreations of the game are available for Visual Pinball that runs on Windows.

References

External links

Pinpedia listing for Cirqus Voltaire
Latest Visual Pinball 10 Version

1997 pinball machines
Bally pinball machines